MediaQuest Holdings, Inc. is a Philippine-based media conglomerate that provides radio and television broadcasting, as well as direct-to-home satellite services and print media. Though an affiliate of telecommunications company PLDT, MediaQuest is owned by the former's Beneficial Trust Fund (corporate entity - BTF Holdings, Inc.), a retirement pension plan funded through its Philippine Depository Receipts. PLDT does not directly own any media property as the current 1987 Constitution states that media companies should be 100% owned by Filipinos and the company's major shareholders include foreign entities such as First Pacific and Nippon Telegraph and Telephone.

MediaQuest owns and operates national media firms TV5 Network (TV5) and Nation Broadcasting Corporation (NBC), as well as pay TV provider and regional radio network Cignal TV. MediaQuest also owns majority interest on newspaper companies The Philippine Star and  Business World Publishing Corporation (BusinessWorld), and 30% of film production unit Unitel Group.

History
MediaQuest was established in the 1998 by PLDT through its Beneficial Trust Fund, a retirement fund agency. First with the acquisition of Home Cable, a direct-to-home cable TV subscription service and second largest cable TV company through Unilink Communications. On July 1, 2001, Home Cable merged its CATV operation to Sky Cable Corporation and created Beyond Cable Holdings, Inc. with an enterprise value of P14.5 billion. Beyond Cable Inc. controls 66.5% through Benpres Holdings and 33.5% through MediaQuest Holdings Inc. Home Cable ceased its operations on June 30, 2005 (which was replaced by SkyCable Silver). PLDT sold its stake in SkyCable to the owner by ABS-CBN Corporation and Lopez Holdings Corporation in 2008.

In 1998, MediaQuest acquired Nation Broadcasting Corporation from the consortium of the Yabut family and then House Speaker Manny Villar.

In 2001, MediaQuest bought a controlling stake in GMA Network. This was until 2006 when an attempt to acquire GMA was failed. MediaQuest attempted again to acquire the network in 2012 but the talks collapsed.

In 2007, MediaQuest acquired GV Broadcasting Systems and its owner Satventures Inc., a direct-to-home satellite provider and radio network, from the Galang family. At the same year, it launched myTV as a mobile TV service. GV was later renamed as Mediascape, and officially launched its satellite pay TV service Cignal in 2009.

In March 2010, MediaQuest acquired ABC Development Corporation and its blocktimer MPB Primedia Inc. from a joint consortium led by former PLDT Chairman Antonio "Tony Boy" O. Cojuangco, Jr. and Malaysia-based broadcaster Media Prima Berhad.

In 2013, MediaQuest, through subsidiary Hasting Holdings, took over and later acquires the 70% ownership share on newspaper BusinessWorld after contributing to the company's capital. The group has previously acquired an 18% stake in national newspaper, the Philippine Daily Inquirer.

In 2014, MediaQuest acquired a majority stake of 51% in The Philippine Star. The Belmonte family, owners of the newspaper, retained a 21% stake, as well as management and editorial control. Pangilinan has since appointed Atty. Ray Espinosa as the company's new chairman of the board.

In May 2022, PLDT named Smart Communications SVP/Head of Consumer Business Jane Basas as new President and CEO of MediaQuest Holdings, replacing Espinosa who remained as board member and retained his positions for Philstar/Hastings and Meralco. Basas previously served as President/CEO of Cignal TV from 2016 to 2020.

In June 2022, ABS-CBN engaged into advanced talks with TV5's parent company, MediaQuest Holdings to allow its resources combined after Villar Group-backed Advanced Media Broadcasting System acquired ABS-CBN's former frequency, and slated to begin operations in October 2022 as AMBS-2. On August 10, 2022, ABS-CBN and MediaQuest Holdings signed a "convertible note agreement" as announced on the following day for the ABS-CBN's investment into TV5 Network by acquiring 34.99% of the company's common shares, with an option to increase it stake to 49.92% within the next eight years with MediaQuest remained as the TV5's controlling shareholder with 64.79% of TV5's common shares. Meanwhile, MediaQuest Holdings executed a "debt instruments agreement" by acquiring a 38.88% minority stake of ABS-CBN's cable TV arm Sky Cable Corporation through Cignal TV, with an option to acquire an additional 61.12% of Sky Cable shares within the next eight years. After ABS-CBN and TV5 had a partnership deal, the House of Representatives has set a briefing and SAGIP Representative Rodante Marcoleta commented that TV5 violated the broadcasting franchise with ABS-CBN deal. But a day later, the briefing scheduled was cancelled that supposed to happen on that day. On August 24, the two broadcasting companies agreed to pause their closing preparations for the deal following concerns from politicians and some government agencies. However, the agreement was terminated on September 1.

Assets

Television and radio
TV5 Network, Inc.  (TV5)
Nation Broadcasting Corporation (NBC)
Mediascape / Cignal TV, Inc. (Cignal)

Motion picture
Unitel Group (30%)
UXS Inc. 
Straight Shooters
Cignal Entertainment

Print publishing
Hastings Holdings (Philstar Media Group)
BusinessWorld (70%)
The Philippine Star (51%)

Previous assets
Beyond Cable Holdings - sold to Benpres Holdings in 2008
Home Cable (1999–2005)
AKTV (80% owned by TV5, 20% minority share in Viva Communications subsidiary, Viva Television) - defunct

See also
PLDT

References

 
PLDT subsidiaries
Companies listed on the Philippine Stock Exchange
Mass media companies of the Philippines
Companies based in Makati
Conglomerate companies of the Philippines